The Battle of Adrianople was fought in 1254 between the Byzantine Greek Empire of Nicaea and the Bulgarians. Michael Asen I of Bulgaria tried to reconquer land taken by the Empire of Nicaea, but the swift advance of Theodore II Lascaris caught the Bulgarians unprepared. The Byzantines were victorious.

References 

13th century in Bulgaria
Battles involving the Second Bulgarian Empire
Battles of the Byzantine–Bulgarian Wars in Thrace
Battles involving the Empire of Nicaea
Conflicts in 1254
History of Edirne
1254 in Europe